Lambertia ilicifolia, commonly known as the holly-leaved honeysuckle, is a shrub which is endemic to south-west Western Australia.

References

ilicifolia
Eudicots of Western Australia
Plants described in 1843
Taxa named by William Jackson Hooker
Endemic flora of Southwest Australia